Route 286 is a  east–west state highway in Salisbury, Massachusetts and Seabrook, New Hampshire. The route was previously known as Route 86 and was renumbered to avoid a numerical conflict with the designation of a freeway as Interstate 86 in the 1970s. Route 286 is the highest numbered New Hampshire state highway.

Route description
The western terminus of Route 286 is Interstate 95 in Salisbury, Massachusetts, where it is accessed via exit 90 (old exit 60) on I-95. Traffic coming from I-95 uses Toll Road, while traffic going to I-95 uses Main Street. The divergence resolves at Pike Street, where Route 286 proceeds eastward, crossing U.S. Route 1 where it becomes Collins Street. After crossing into Seabrook, New Hampshire, Collins Street and Route 286 diverge at an intersection with South Main Street.

History
 70pxRoute 286 was formerly numbered 86 and renumbered to make room for I-86, which is now designated as part of I-84.
Route 286 was previously designated as Route 86 in both Massachusetts and New Hampshire.

Between 1971 and 1984, Massachusetts had an Interstate 86, which ran from Sturbridge, Massachusetts, to Hartford, Connecticut.  The construction of I-86 prompted Massachusetts Route 86 to be renumbered to "286" because, according to Massachusetts Highway Department (MassHighway) protocol, a state highway and an Interstate Highway may not share the same number.  (The only exception to this rule is Massachusetts Route 295 and I-295, which are on opposite ends of the state.)  When Massachusetts renumbered Route 86 to 286, New Hampshire matched the change on its section.

In 1984, plans to connect I-84 along the present day I-384/US 6 corridor from Hartford to Providence were scuttled for environmental reasons.  As a result, I-84 was rerouted onto the completed I-86 freeway. The existing section of the old I-84 became I-384. The Massachusetts State Route has kept the 286 number, and by extension the New Hampshire road has as well.

Today, I-86 is the former Southern Tier Expressway/NY Route 17 in New York State as that road is upgraded to Interstate Highway standards.  Modern I-86 is unrelated to the I-86 that existed in Massachusetts.

Major intersections

References

External links

 Massachusetts State Route 286 on Flickr
 New Hampshire State Route 286 on Flickr

Numbered routes in Massachusetts
State highways in New Hampshire
Route 286
Route 286